Chuanyin (30 January 1927 – 11 March 2023) was a Chinese Buddhist monk, Chan master and religious leader. He was best known as Venerable Master of the Buddhist Association of China.

Early life
Chuanyin was born Lü Yudai in Zhuanghe, Liaoning, on 30 January 1927.

Religious life
In 1947, he took refuge in the Three Jewels under the master Chongren, and received complete ordination under Xuyun, in Zhenru Chan Temple, in 1955, as the 9th generation of the Guiyang school. 

In September 1960, he entered the Buddhist Academy of China, where he graduated in September 1965. After graduation, he was assigned to Zhenru Chan Temple.

In 1966, the Cultural Revolution was launched by Mao Zedong, he was transferred to a reclamation farm in Yunjushan as a farmer. After the Cultural Revolution, he regained his identity as a monk.

In the autumn of 1978, he settled at Guoqing Temple in Tiantai County, Zhejiang.

In December 1979, he was transferred to the Buddhist Association of China in Beijing.

In the Spring of 1981, he pursued advanced studies in Japan, where he graduated from Bukkyo University in December 1983.

He was appointed dean of the Buddhist Academy of China, in 1984, becoming vice president in 1986.

In August 1991, he resided in Fangguang Temple in Mount Tiantai. Three years later, he served as abbot of Donglin Temple in Mount Lu.

In February 1999, he became the president of the Buddhist Association of Beijing.

On 3 February 2010, Chuanyin replaced Yicheng to become Venerable Master of the Buddhist Association of China. On 22 October that same year, he was elected a member of the 11th National Committee of the Chinese People's Political Consultative Conference. 

In March 2013, he was elected a Standing Committee member of the 12th National Committee of the Chinese People's Political Consultative Conference.

Death
Chuanyin died on 11 March 2023, at Donglin Temple, in Jiujiang, Jiangxi, at the age of 96.

References

External links

1927 births
2023 deaths
Republic of China Buddhist monks
Chan Buddhists
People from Dalian
People's Republic of China Buddhist monks
Bukkyo University alumni
Religious leaders in China